The Franchise is an American reality-documentary television show that debuted on July 13, 2011, on the Showtime television network. The series follows Major League Baseball (MLB) teams before and during the baseball season.

The first season of the show followed the San Francisco Giants as they defended their World Series title during the 2011 Major League Baseball season. The series focused mostly on the players themselves and followed their lives on and off the field.  The players featured included Matt Cain, Barry Zito, Pablo Sandoval, Brian Wilson, Buster Posey, and Ryan Vogelsong.  The Franchise provides a rare inside view into a Major League clubhouse, showing the ups and downs of a long and trying professional baseball season.

The second season premiered on July 11, 2012 and featured the Miami Marlins, in their first season in their new park. The season was cut short by one episode.

On January 12, 2013, Showtime Entertainment President David Nevins said the series will return if the "right team and the right story" is found. The Cleveland Guardians have been linked to the show as a possible choice.

Episodes

Season 1: 2011

Season 2: 2012

References

External links
The Franchise Official Website

2011 American television series debuts
2012 American television series endings
English-language television shows
Showtime (TV network) original programming
San Francisco Giants
Miami Marlins
Major League Baseball on television